Yanam district is one of the four districts of the Union Territory of Puducherry in India.

Geography

It is located south of Kakinada port on the north bank of Godavari river, slightly inland. It is bordered and surrounded by Konaseema district on South and Kakinada district on north (Districts of Andhra State)

Revenue villages
Apart from the town of Yanam itself, the following villages fall under the district's jurisdiction: 
 Agraharam
 Darialatippa
 Farampeta
 Francetippa
 Guerempeta
 Kanakalapeta
 Kurasampeta
 Mettakur

Demographics
According to the 2011 census Yanam district has a population of 55,626, roughly equal to the island of Greenland. This gives it a ranking of 629th in India (out of a total of 640). 
Its population growth rate over the decade 2001-2011 was 77.15%.	Yanam	has a sex ratio of 	1039	females for every 1000 males, and a literacy rate of 80.26%.

See also
Yanam (India)
Yanam Municipality
Karaikal district
Mahé district
Puducherry district

References

 
Districts of Puducherry